A radio shack is a room or structure used for housing radio equipment.

History
During radio's early days, equipment was experimental and often home-built. The first radio transmitters used a loud spark gap to generate radio waves, and so were often housed in a separate outbuilding or shed. When radio was first adopted by the U.S. Navy, a small, wooden structure placed on deck to house the ship's radio equipment became known as the "radio shack". Today, a radio shack can be anywhere that radio equipment is housed and operated, usually a room such as with amateur radio stations, but for some the entire "shack" may consist of a hand-held radio or two while others may operate mobile equipment in a vehicle. In amateur radio use, the room housing the equipment is often called a "ham shack".

See also
Amateur radio

References

Electronics and society
Amateur radio